William Jennings "Wee" Coyle (March 10, 1888 – October 1, 1977) was a Republican politician from the U.S. state of Washington. He served as the eighth Lieutenant Governor of Washington.

While attending the University of Washington, he played on the school's football team as a quarterback. In 1911, he was made team captain. He later served in World War I, receiving a Distinguished Service Cross after being injured in the Meuse–Argonne offensive.

References

1888 births
1977 deaths
20th-century American politicians
Gonzaga Bulldogs football coaches
Lieutenant Governors of Washington (state)
Washington (state) Republicans
Washington Huskies football players
People from Amador County, California